The 2012 Asian Artistic Gymnastics Championships were the 5th edition of the Asian Artistic Gymnastics Championships, and were held in Putian, China from November 11 to November 14, 2012.

Medal summary

Men

Women

Medal table

Participating nations 
100 athletes from 17 nations competed.

 (12)
 (8)
 (8)
 (6)
 (12)
 (7)
 (3)
 (1)
 (1)
 (12)
 (3)
 (1)
 (11)
 (1)
 (3)
 (3)
 (8)

References
 Results
 Complete Results
 Men's Report
 Women's Report

A
Asian Gymnastics Championships
Asian Gymnastics Championships
International gymnastics competitions hosted by China